Khanpur (Punjabi) is a village in Chakwal Tehsil, Chakwal District, Punjab, Pakistan. It lies about 42 kilometers from the M2 motorway and about 23 kilometers from the district capital, Chakwal. It falls along the Sohawa Chakwal Road and connects Choa Road with Sohawa-Chakwal Road through Dhok Talian Link Road. Khanpur is birthplace of great Sufi Saint Baba Shah Murad whose shrine is located in nearby Takya Sah Murad Village. Khanpur is a commercial Centre of over 150 nearby villages. Khanpur is also village of Sufi Saint Sufi Muhammad Azam Naqibi Suharwardi Qadri Naqshbandi Chishti (Civil Judge) who is buried in Khanpur graveyard.

Educational institutions
Government Girls College
Khanpur Grammar School (KGS) Pre-School
Khanpur Grammar School (KGS) Secondary School
Government High School For Boys Khanpur
Government Girls Higher Secondary School Khanpur
Government Primary School Khanpur
Air Foundation School System Khanpur Campus
Lords School Khanpur
Jinnah Institute Of Science And Commerce For Girls Khanpur
Khanpur Science And Commerce College For Boys
Folcon Grammar School Khanpur
Quaid Academy Public School Khanpur
Munir Public School Khanpur
Iqbal Montessori School Khanpur
Cambridge Science and Commerce College Khanpur
Allied School Mushtaq Campus Khanpur

References 

Chakwal District
Populated places in Chakwal District